Rosemary Wahu Kagwi, professionally known by her mononym Wahu, is a Kenyan singer-songwriter, former fashion model, actress and entrepreneur.

Early life and education 
She was born on 22nd March in the year 1980 in Nairobi. Wahu attended Hospital Hill Primary school and proceeded to Precious Blood High School, which is located at Riruta. While in school, she wrote her first song. Wahu is a former model and University of Nairobi student, graduating with a degree in Bachelor of Arts in mathematics & communication.

Career 
She started her musical career in 2000. She released her first single "Niangalie" which  received positive reception all over Africa and the world at large. Her first three singles were "Niangalie", "Esha" and "Liar".  Wahu released her first major hit, "Sitishiki" around 2005.   Some of her music has been produced by the Ogopa DJs.
Wahu has entertained audiences alongside many Kenyan and African Artistes like Kleptomaniacs, Fally Ipupa, Nonini, Nameless, Wyre, Qqu, and P-Unit. She is the inaugural recipient of the MTV Africa Music Awards 2008, for Best Female Artist category. Moreover, she has won the Pearl of Africa Music Awards, Chaguo La Teeniez Awards and Kisima Music Awards. In the acting industry, Wahu had a leading role in the television series Tazama. In 2017 she released a new gospel song "Sifa". In the year 2013 she opened her saloon business the Afrosiri salon which offers services such as spa, hair, manicure and pedicure services.

Personal life 
She is married to David Mathenge alias Nameless, another award-winning Kenyan musician. They have 3 daughters. She dedicated her biggest hit to date "Sweet Love" to one of her daughters (TUMI)

Awards and nominations

Awards
MTV Africa Music Awards 2008 – Best Female
2008 Pearl of Africa Music Awards – Best Female Artist (Kenya)
2008 CHAT Awards – Favourite Female Artiste
2008 Kisima Awards – Best Song ("Sweet Love") & Best Reggae Artiste/Group
2010 Tanzania music awards – Best Reggae Song ('Leo (Reggae remix)' with AY)

Nominations
2006 Pearl of Africa Music Awards – Best Kenyan Female Artiste
MTV Africa Music Awards 2008 – Best Newcomer
2008 MOBO Awards – Best African Act
2008 Kora Awards – Best Artiste or Group from East Africa (not yet held)
2009 Tanzania Music Awards – Best East African Song ("Sweet Love")
2009 MTV Africa Music Awards – Best Video ("Little Things You Do" with Bobi Wine)
2009 Channel O Music Video Awards – Best African East & Best Ragga Dancehall Video ("Sweet Love")
2011 Tanzania Music Awards – Best Song and Best Collaboration Song ('Mkono Mmoja' with Chege & Temba)

References

1980 births
Living people
21st-century Kenyan women singers
Kisima Music Award winners
Kenyan television actresses
University of Nairobi alumni
21st-century Kenyan actresses